The Korean Film Council (KOFIC) is a state-supported, self-administered organization under the Ministry of Culture, Sports and Tourism (MCST) of the Republic of Korea.

History
KOFIC was launched in 1973 as the Korean Motion Picture Promotion Corporation (KMPPC). It changed its name to Korean Film Commission in 1999, to be set up as a self-regulating body that could institute film policy without requiring the ratification of the Ministry of Culture. It changed its name once more to Korean Film Council in 2004 to avoid confusion with local film commissions that provide support for location shooting.

Roles
KOFIC is composed of nine commissioners, including one full-time chairman and 8 committee members appointed by the Ministry of Culture, Sports and Tourism in order to discuss and decide on the main policies related to Korean films.

It aims to promote and support Korean films both in Korea and abroad.

Timeline (1973-2013) 
 April 1973 - Founded as Korea Motion Picture Promotion Corporation
 March 1984 - Korean Academy of Film Arts (KAFA) established
 October 1997 - Korean Film Promotion Fund established
 November 1997 - Completion of Namyangju Studios
 February 1998 - Film Promotion Law sets legal framework for KOFIC
 May 1999 - Korean Film Commission launched
 March 2004 - Korean Film Commission renamed Korean Film Council
 July 2007 - Film Development Fund established
 March 2012 - Korean Film Business Center opens in Beijing
 October 2013 - Deadline for KOFIC to relocate to Busan

See also
 KOFIC Location Incentive

References

External links
 

Film commissions
Film organizations in South Korea
1973 establishments in South Korea
Arts organizations established in 1973